Clear and Present Danger is a 1994 American action thriller film directed by Phillip Noyce and based on Tom Clancy's 1989 novel of the same name. It is a sequel to The Hunt for Red October (1990) and Patriot Games (1992). All three movies featured Clancy's character Jack Ryan, though Ford only played the role in the last two. It is the last film version of Clancy's novels to feature Harrison Ford as Ryan and James Earl Jones as Vice Admiral James Greer, as well as the final installment directed by Noyce.

As in the novel, Ryan is appointed CIA Acting Deputy Director (Intelligence) (DDI), and discovers he is being kept in the dark by colleagues who are conducting a covert war against a drug cartel in Colombia, apparently with the approval of the President. The film premiered in theaters in the United States on August 3, 1994, and was a major financial success, earning over $200 million at the box office.

Plot
A United States Coast Guard vessel intercepts and boards a U.S. registered yacht in the Caribbean Sea. Evidence shows that the ship's previous occupants, American businessman Peter Hardin and his family, were murdered by the occupying Colombian crew. CIA analyst Jack Ryan learns that Hardin was laundering money for the South American Cali Cartel. Drug lord Ernesto Escobedo ordered Hardin's murder for embezzling millions in drug profits. U.S. President Bennett, Hardin's close friend, discreetly authorizes National Security Advisor James Cutter to initiate covert operations in Colombia to destroy the cartel.

Ryan is appointed acting Deputy Director of Intelligence when Admiral James Greer undergoes treatment for pancreatic cancer. Ryan requests Congress increase funding to support Colombians fighting the drug cartels, giving his assurance there is no U.S. military involvement. Ryan is unaware that Cutter will use the funds to assemble RECIPROCITY, a special forces team recruited by CIA operative John Clark, and aided by Robert Ritter, the CIA Deputy Director of Operations. President Bennett sends Ryan to negotiate with the Colombian government to allow the United States to seize Escobedo's assets, including $650 million hidden in off-shore accounts. Escobedo's intelligence officer, Colonel Félix Cortez, secretly orders the Cartel to ambush Ryan's convoy. Jack survives, though several colleagues are killed, including Dan Murray and FBI Director Emile Jacobs. Cortez's identity is ascertained after he murders Murray's secretary, Moira, who was an unwitting informant.

Escobedo, blamed for the attack, organizes a meeting with the other Cartel heads. RECIPROCITY discovers this and launches an airstrike on the meeting location. Escobedo and Cortez, en route to the gathering, barely escape unscathed. Cortez learns Americans were responsible and brokers a deal with Cutter: Cortez will kill Escobedo to assume leadership, then will reduce drug shipments to the U.S. and allow American law enforcement to make regular arrests to influence public opinion that the United States is winning the drug war. In exchange, Cortez wants the location of RECIPROCITY and all CIA support eliminated to establish his position within the Cartel. Cutter accepts Cortez's deal, then strands Clark's team, who are overwhelmed by Cortez's mercenaries in the jungle.

Unbeknownst to Cutter, U.S. surveillance monitored his conversation with Cortez. Ryan accesses Ritter's computer and obtains evidence regarding the illegal Colombian operations. Ritter, however, warns Ryan that because he obtained funding for the operation, Congress will hold Ryan solely responsible, whereas Ritter and Cutter have been granted President Bennett's pre-emptive pardons from any wrongdoing. Jack flies to Bogota to seek out Clark, unaware Cutter and Ritter have falsely told Clark that Ryan betrayed RECIPROCITY. Ryan and Clark team up after Clark realizes Ritter and Cutter deceived them both.

Ryan and Clark procure a helicopter and fly to RECIPROCITY's last known position. They find team sniper Chavez, who reports that most members were killed; Captain Ramirez and one remaining squad member were captured. Ryan meets with Escobedo and informs him of Cortez's deception, whilst Clark simultaneously commences rescuing his men who are being held captive in a coffee facility fronting Escobedo's cocaine operation. Escobedo confronts Cortez but is killed by Cortez's associate. Ryan narrowly escapes with Clark and the freed prisoners. Chavez kills Cortez during the escape, saving Ryan. Back in the United States, Ryan confronts President Bennett and refuses to help cover up the conspiracy. He testifies before the Congressional Oversight Committee about the recent events.

Cast

Production

Development
After completing The Hunt for Red October, John McTiernan had wanted to direct an adaptation of Clear and Present Danger, and departed from the production after an early script by John Milius was rejected in favor of Patriot Games. Milius's first draft was more faithful to the original book than the final film, and he later added the sequence where Jack Ryan is ambushed in SUVs. He said that the original ending had Cortez going to Washington to kill the National Security Advisor, only to be killed in a mugging by drug addicts.  After Clancy's dissatisfaction with Patriot Games, he was reluctant to allow any further adaptations of his material, but acquiesced after negotiations with Paramount Pictures and a large financial deal. In March 1992, Donald E. Stewart was hired to rewrite Milius's script to provide greater screen time to Jack Ryan. After Clancy openly criticized the script, Steven Zaillian rewrote it further in an attempt to gain his approval. Milius was retained during production to provide consultation on the action scenes.

Production 
The film was shot in Mexico after the studio decided that filming on-location in Colombia was too dangerous, with Mexico City standing in for Bogotá and the Hacienda San Gabriel de la Palmas in Cuernavaca serving as a set for Escobedo's headquarters.  Ironically, the decision to produce the film in Mexico encountered further difficulties due to the outbreak of the Chiapas conflict. The film ran drastically behind schedule and over budget, and part of the footage shot in the United States was destroyed due to the 1994 Northridge earthquake. After negative results from test screenings, parts of the film were reshot using scenes written by Stewart and Zaillian.

Music

The film's musical score was composed by James Horner. Milan Records released an album featuring selections from the score on August 2, 1994.

An expanded two-disc collector's edition was released in 2013 by specialty label Intrada Records. The new version now includes the complete score by Horner, remixed from the original scoring master tapes with cues appearing in the same order as they appear in the film.

Some parts of the soundtrack are based on the music from James Horner's soundtrack for Gorky Park, but played with different instruments.

Reception

Critical response
The film received positive reviews from critics. Rotten Tomatoes gives it a rating of 80% based on reviews from 45 critics, with an average score of 6.90/10. The site's consensus states: "Perfecting the formula established in earlier installments, Clear and Present Danger reunites its predecessor's creative core to solidly entertaining effect." At Metacritic, which assigns a weighted average out of 100 to critics' reviews, Clear and Present Danger received a score of 74 based on 14 reviews. Audiences polled by CinemaScore gave the film an average grade of "A" on an A+ to F scale.

Mick LaSalle, writing for the San Francisco Chronicle, commented how it "delights in an almost boyish way in the trappings of power: rocket launchers and high-tech missiles, flags, ceremony and political double-speak."
James Berardinelli, who wrote for ReelViews, remarked, "Clear and Present Danger is all plot and no characters. The people running around on screen have about as much depth as the sheen of sweat on Harrison Ford's forehead. Jack Ryan is the most disappointing of all. He's disgustingly virtuous: a flawless fighter for good and justice, a Superman without the cape. I spent half the movie wondering if this guy was ever going to show anything to mark him as vaguely human." In Reel Power: Hollywood Cinema and American Supremacy, author  Matthew Alford formulated a critique of the film, pointing out that supporting characters like Cutter and Ritter are pointedly squeamish about the use of force. He queried, "Where is this abundance of sensitivity from the US national security apparatus towards the people of Latin America in the real world?". He concluded, "The answers are all too obvious, except to a Hollywood hooked on schmaltz, willfully ignorant of reality and in thrall to power."

Box office
Clear and Present Danger opened strongly at the U.S. box office, grossing $20,348,017 in its first weekend and holding the top spot for two weeks. It went on to gross an estimated $122 million in the U.S., and $94 million in foreign revenue for a worldwide total of $216 million.

Year-end lists 
 8th – Kenneth Turan, Los Angeles Times
 Honorable mention –  Glenn Lovell, San Jose Mercury News
 Honorable mention – John Hurley, Staten Island Advance
 Honorable mention – David Elliott, The San Diego Union-Tribune
 Honorable mention – Michael Mills, The Palm Beach Post
 Honorable mention – Dan Craft, The Pantagraph
 Honorable mention – Bob Carlton, The Birmingham News

Accolades
The film was nominated for two Academy Awards for Best Sound (Donald O. Mitchell, Michael Herbick, Frank A. Montaño and Art Rochester) and Best Sound Effects Editing (John Leveque and Bruce Stambler), but lost both awards to Speed.

See also

 1994 in film

References
Footnotes

External links
 
 
 
 
 
 
 

1994 films
1994 action thriller films
1990s spy thriller films
American action thriller films
American political thriller films
American sequel films
Films about Colombian drug cartels
Films based on American novels
Films based on military novels
Films based on works by Tom Clancy
Paramount Pictures films
Films directed by Phillip Noyce
Films produced by Mace Neufeld
Films set in the 1980s
Films set in Colombia
Films set in Washington, D.C.
Films shot in Virginia
Films shot in Ecuador
Films shot in Mexico
Films shot in California
Murder in films
Ryanverse films
Films with screenplays by Steven Zaillian
Films scored by James Horner
Films with screenplays by John Milius
Colombia–United States relations
Films set in the White House
Films set in Langley, Virginia
Films about the Federal Bureau of Investigation
Films shot in Mexico City
1990s English-language films
1990s American films

ja:今そこにある危機#映画